Michèle Rakotoson (born 1948) is a writer, journalist, and Film Maker from Madagascar. Her novels include Dadabé. Since 1983, she has lived mainly in France.

Works 
Dadabe: et autres nouvelles (1984) 
Le bain des reliques: roman malgache (1988) 
La Maison morte (The Dead House) (play, 1991)
Elle, au printemps: roman (1996) 
Henoÿ – Fragments en écorce (1998) 
Lalana: roman (2002) 
Juillet au pays: recit (2007) 
Tovonay, l'enfant du Sud: roman (2010) 
Passeport pour Antananarivo : Tana la belle: recit (2011) 
Madame à la campagne : Chroniques malgaches (2015) 
 Ambatomanga, Le silence et la douleur"", Édition Broche, (2022)

 See also 
 Nicolas Vatomanga (Slam Jazz Projekt)

References

Sources
 Hughes, A. (2001). Encyclopedia of Contemporary French Culture'' (Encyclopedias of Contemporary Culture). Routledge.  – p. 247

External links
Africultures
Bio details, University of Western Australia

Malagasy novelists
Women novelists
1948 births
Living people
Malagasy women writers
Malagasy journalists
Malagasy women journalists
20th-century novelists
20th-century women writers
20th-century journalists
21st-century novelists
21st-century women writers
French-language writers from Madagascar